Manél Minicucci (born 13 May 1995) is an Italian footballer who plays as a midfielder for Clodiense. He also holds Spanish citizenship.

Club career
He made his Serie B debut for Bari on 22 May 2015 in a game against Spezia.

In August 2021, he moved to Serie D club Recanatese. His contract was extended for the next season, on Serie C.

On 1 February 2023, Minicucci signed with Serie D club Clodiense.

References

External links
 
 

1995 births
Living people
Footballers from Rome
Italian people of Spanish descent
Italian footballers
Association football midfielders
Serie B players
Serie C players
Serie D players
S.S.C. Bari players
S.S. Fidelis Andria 1928 players
S.S. Monopoli 1966 players
Latina Calcio 1932 players
Pol. Olympia Agnonese players
A.S.D. Football Club Matese players
U.S.D. Recanatese 1923 players
Clodiense S.S.D. players
First Football League (Croatia) players
NK Hrvatski Dragovoljac players
Italian expatriate footballers
Expatriate footballers in Croatia
Italian expatriate sportspeople in Croatia